Events in the year 1617 in Norway.

Incumbents
Monarch: Christian IV

Events
 24 December - Eastern Finnmark suffered a terrible storm. A great majority of the male population was out at sea at that time and were surprised by the storm, ten boats sank and forty men drowned.

Arts and literature

Births

Deaths

Full date unknown
Niels Claussøn Senning, bishop (born c. 1580).

See also

References